Koiak 10 - Coptic Calendar - Koiak 12 

The eleventh day of the Coptic month of Koiak, the fourth month of the Coptic year. On a common year, this day corresponds to December 7, of the Julian Calendar, and December 20 of the Gregorian Calendar. This day falls in the Coptic season of Peret, the season of emergence. This day falls in the Nativity Fast.

Commemorations

Saints 

 The martyrdom of Saint Ptolemy of Dendra 
 The departure of Saint Pijmi the Anchorite

Other commemorations 

 The consecration of the Church of Saint Claudius, in the city of Bakour, in the district of Abu-Teig

References 

Days of the Coptic calendar